James S. Redpath is a Canadian mining engineer, and former president of J.S. Redpath Limited a mining contractor and engineering company based in North Bay, Ontario.  In 1975 he was awarded the Engineering Medal by the Professional Engineers Ontario.  Redpath founded J.S. Redpath in 1962 in Val-d'Or, which has since evolved into an international company with billion-dollar revenue.

Publications

References 

Canadian mining engineers
People from North Bay, Ontario
Living people
Year of birth missing (living people)